The James McBean Residence is a house in Rochester, Minnesota designed by Frank Lloyd Wright. This Usonian house is an example of the second type (Prefab #2) of the Marshall Erdman Prefab Houses. This house and the Walter Rudin House have the same floor plan and vary only in minor details such as paint color and siting, because they are the only two Prefab #2 houses in existence.

Construction
The house is constructed from concrete block with horizontal board and batten siding. A row of windows just below the soffit make the chunky flat cantilevered roof appear to float above the house. A carport attached to one corner of the house completes the design.

References

 Storrer, William Allin. The Frank Lloyd Wright Companion. University Of Chicago Press, 2006,  (S.412.2)

External links
 All-Wright Site - Frank Lloyd Wright Building Guide - Minnesota
 Exterior photographs of the McBean Residence

McBean Residence
McBean Residence
McBean